Mooresville may refer to:

 Mooresville, Alabama
 Mooresville, Indiana
 Mooresville, Missouri
 Mooresville, North Carolina
 Mooresville, Ohio
 Mooresville, Tennessee
 Mooresville, West Virginia
 Mooreville, Michigan, sometimes spelled "Mooresville"